The unitary executive theory is a theory of United States constitutional law which holds that the President of the United States possesses the power to control the entire federal executive branch. The doctrine is rooted in Article Two of the United States Constitution, which vests "the executive power" of the United States in the President. Although that general principle is widely accepted, there is disagreement about the strength and scope of the doctrine. It can be said that some favor a "strongly unitary" executive, while others favor a "weakly unitary" executive.   The former group argue, for example, that Congress's power to interfere with intra-executive decision-making (such as firing executive branch officials) is limited, and that the President can control policy-making by all executive agencies within the limits set for those agencies by Congress. Still others agree that the Constitution requires a unitary executive, but believe this to be harmful, and propose its abolition by constitutional amendment.

Plural executives exist in several states where, in contrast to the federal government, executive officers such as lieutenant governor, attorney general, comptroller, secretary of state, and others, are elected independently of the state's governor. The Executive Branch of the Texan state government is a textbook example of this type of executive structure. However, only the State of North Carolina maintains a plural executive whereby the Chief Executive's actions can be curbed by other elected executive officers. The group of North Carolina executive officers is known as the North Carolina Council of State and it wields fair amounts of statutory powers when approving monetary and property transactions by the state government. This type of plural executive, used in Japan, Israel, Italy and Sweden is one in which a collegial body composes the executive branch – however, that collegial body does not comprise multiple members elected in elections, but is rather more akin to the US Cabinet or UK Cabinet in formation and structure.

Theory
The Vesting Clause of Article II provides, "The executive Power [of the United States] shall be vested in a President of the United States of America." Proponents of the unitary executive theory argue that this language, along with the Take Care Clause ("The President shall take care that the laws be faithfully executed ..."), creates a "hierarchical, unified executive department under the direct control of the President."

The general principle that the President controls the entire executive branch was originally rather innocuous, but extreme forms of the theory have developed. Former White House Counsel John Dean explains: "In its most extreme form, unitary executive theory can mean that neither Congress nor the federal courts can tell the President what to do or how to do it, particularly regarding national security matters."

According to law professors Lawrence Lessig and Cass Sunstein, "No one denies that in some sense the framers created a unitary executive; the question is in what sense. Let us distinguish between a strong and a weak version." In either its strong or weak form, the theory would limit the power of Congress to divest the President of control of the executive branch. The "strongly unitary" theory posits stricter limits on Congress than the "weakly unitary" theory. During his confirmation hearing to become an Associate Justice on the United States Supreme Court, Samuel Alito seemed to endorse a weaker version of the unitary executive theory.

Some scholars oppose even the "weakly unitary" theory and favor creating a plural executive, as in the many state governments that separately elect an attorney general. However, those scholars acknowledge that a constitutional amendment would be required to eliminate the federal unitary executive.

Proponents of a strongly unitary theory argue that the president possesses all of the executive power and can therefore control subordinate officers and agencies of the executive branch. This implies that the power of Congress to remove executive agencies or officers from Presidential control is limited. Thus, under the strongly unitary executive theory, independent agencies and counsels are unconstitutional to the extent that they exercise discretionary executive power not controlled by the President.

The judicial branch implications are that a part of the executive branch cannot sue another part because "the executive cannot sue himself." If the federal courts were to adjudicate disputes between executive agencies, it would violate the doctrine of separation of powers.

Adoption of constitutional provisions
The phrase "unitary executive" was discussed as early as the Philadelphia Convention in 1787, referring mainly to having a single individual fill the office of President, as proposed in the Virginia Plan. The alternative was to have several executives or an executive council, as proposed in the New Jersey Plan and as promoted by Elbridge Gerry, Edmund Randolph, and George Mason.

At the Pennsylvania ratifying convention in 1787, James Wilson emphasized the advantages of a single chief executive, including greater accountability, vigor, decisiveness, and responsibility:

[T]he executive authority is one. By this means we obtain very important advantages. We may discover from history, from reason, and from experience, the security which this furnishes. The executive power is better to be trusted when it has no screen. Sir, we have a responsibility in the person of our President; he cannot act improperly, and hide either his negligence or inattention; he cannot roll upon any other person the weight of his criminality; no appointment can take place without his nomination; and he is responsible for every nomination he makes. We secure vigor. We well know what numerous executives are. We know there is neither vigor, decision, nor responsibility, in them. Add to all this, that officer is placed high, and is possessed of power far from being contemptible; yet not a single privilege is annexed to his character; far from being above the laws, he is amenable to them in his private character as a citizen, and in his public character by impeachment.

In 1788, the letters of the Federal Farmer were published, generally considered among the most astute of Anti-Federalist writings. The pseudonymous Federal Farmer defended the proposed unitary executive, arguing that "a single man seems to be peculiarly well circumstanced to superintend the execution of laws with discernment and decision, with promptitude and uniformity."

Meanwhile, Federalists such as James Madison were emphasizing an additional advantage of a unitary executive. In Federalist No. 51, he wrote that an undivided executive would strengthen the ability of the executive to resist encroachments by the legislature: "As the weight of the legislative authority requires that it should be thus divided [into branches], the weakness of the executive may require, on the other hand, that it should be fortified."

Alexander Hamilton later pointed out that the Constitution grants executive power and legislative power in different ways, with the legislative powers of Congress being expressly limited to what is "herein granted," unlike executive powers which are not expressly limited by an enumeration. Hamilton wrote:

In the article which gives the legislative powers of the government, the expressions are "All legislative powers herein granted shall be vested in a congress of the United States." In that which grants the executive power, the expressions are "The executive power shall be vested in a President of the United States." The enumeration ought therefore to be considered, as intended merely to specify the principal articles implied in the definition of executive power. ...

In other words, the principle of expressio unius may be more applicable as a limitation upon congressional power than upon executive power.  According to Hamilton, the unenumerated executive powers that are vested solely in the President "flow from the general grant of that power, interpreted in conformity with other parts of the Constitution, and with the principles of free government."

Those other parts of the Constitution include the extensive powers granted to Congress. Article I of the Constitution gives Congress the exclusive power to make laws, which the President then must execute, provided that those laws are constitutional. Article I, Section 8, clause 18 of the Constitution known as the Necessary and Proper Clause grants Congress the power to "make all Laws which shall be necessary and proper for carrying into Execution all Powers vested by this Constitution in the Government of the United States, or in any Department or Officer thereof". The Constitution also grants Congress power "To make Rules for the Government and Regulation of the land and naval Forces." The theory of the unitary executive can only be legitimate insofar as it allows Congress to wield its constitutional powers while ensuring that the President can do the same.

Judicial decisions
In the 1926 case of Myers v. United States, the United States Supreme Court decided that the President has the exclusive power to remove executive branch officials, and does not need the approval of the Senate or any other legislative body.  The Court also wrote:

The ordinary duties of officers prescribed by statute come under the general administrative control of the President by virtue of the general grant to him of the executive power, and he may properly supervise and guide their construction of the statutes under which they act in order to secure that unitary and uniform execution of the laws which article 2 of the Constitution evidently contemplated in vesting general executive power in the President alone.

Subsequent cases such as Humphrey's Executor v. United States (Presidential removal of certain kinds of officers), United States v. Nixon (executive privilege), and Bowsher v. Synar (control of executive functions) have flexed the doctrine's reach back and forth. Justice Scalia in his solitary dissent in Morrison v. Olson argued for an unlimited presidential removal power of all persons exercising executive branch powers, which he argued included the independent counsel; the court disagreed, but later moved closer to Scalia's position in Edmond v. United States.

Criticism of the strong version of the theory
Loyola Law School professors Karl Manheim and Allan Ides write that "the separation among the branches is not and never was intended to be airtight," and they point to the President's veto power as an example of the executive exercising legislative power. They also cite other examples of quasi-legislative and quasi-judicial power being exercised by the executive branch, as necessary elements of the administrative state, but they contend that ultimately all administrative power belongs to Congress rather than the President, and the only true "executive" powers are those explicitly described in the Constitution. In this understanding, Manheim and Ides follow in the footsteps of Lessig and Sunstein.

David J. Barron (now a federal judge) and Marty Lederman have also criticized the strong version of the unitary executive theory. They acknowledge that there is a compelling case for a unitary executive within the armed forces. However, they argue that the Constitution does not provide for an equally strong unitary executive outside the military context, and they argue that the Commander in Chief Clause would be superfluous if the same kind of unitary presidential authority resulted from the general constitutional provision vesting executive power in the President.

Unlike the modern constitutions of many other countries, which specify when and how a state of emergency may be declared and which rights may be suspended, the U.S. Constitution itself includes no comprehensive separate regime for emergencies. Some legal scholars believe however that the Constitution gives the president inherent emergency powers by making him commander in chief of the armed forces, or by vesting in him a broad, undefined "executive power." Congress has delegated at least 136 distinct statutory emergency powers to the President, each available upon the declaration of an emergency. Only 13 of these require a declaration from Congress; the remaining 123 are assumed by an executive declaration with no further Congressional input. Congressionally-authorized emergency presidential powers are sweeping and dramatic and range from seizing control of the internet to declaring martial law. This led the American magazine The Atlantic to observe that "the misuse of emergency powers is a standard gambit among leaders attempting to consolidate power", because, in the words of Justice Robert H. Jackson's dissent in Korematsu v. United States, the 1944 Supreme Court decision that upheld the internment of Japanese-Americans, each emergency power "lies about like a loaded weapon, ready for the hand of any authority that can bring forward a plausible claim of an urgent need."

Contrary to claims of some authors, the first administration to make explicit reference to the "Unitary Executive" was not that of President George W. Bush.  For example, in 1987, Ronald Reagan issued a signing statement that declared: "If this provision were interpreted otherwise, so as to require the President to follow the orders of a subordinate, it would plainly constitute an unconstitutional infringement of the President's authority as head of a unitary executive branch."

The George W. Bush administration made the Unitary Executive Theory a common feature of signing statements. For example, Bush once wrote in a signing statement that he would, "construe Title X in Division A of the Act, relating to detainees, in a manner consistent with the constitutional authority of the President to supervise the unitary executive branch and as Commander in Chief and consistent with the constitutional limitations on the judicial power."  Critics acknowledge that part of the President's duty is to "interpret what is, and is not constitutional, at least when overseeing the actions of executive agencies," but critics accused Bush of overstepping that duty by his perceived willingness to overrule US courts.

In film 
In the 2018 biographical film Vice, directed by Adam McKay, the unitary executive theory is explored in some detail and dramatized. Dick Cheney, the film's subject, his lawyer David Addington, Deputy Assistant US Attorney General in the Office of Legal Counsel John Yoo, and Antonin Scalia figure prominently in the theory's development and promotion. They brought it to the foreground of modern discussions on the topic of executive power beginning in 2001, continuing throughout the Bush administration and beyond. The application of this legal doctrine has implications for the prosecution of the War on Terror, the subsequent 2003 U.S. invasion of Iraq, the use of enhanced interrogation techniques at sites such as Guantanamo Bay and Abu Ghraib, and mass surveillance. These are highlighted in the narrative.

See also
 Autocracy
 Big Stick Policy
 Bush Doctrine
 Executive branch
 Federal Reserve Board
 Global policeman 
 Imperial presidency
 The Imperial Presidency (book)
 Independent agencies of the United States government
 Parliamentary system
 Presidential system
 Signing statement
 State of exception
 War on terror

References

Further reading

  Essays by presidential scholars on the origins, history, use, and future of the unitary executive theory, with particular attention to the presidency of George W. Bush.
 
 
 
 
 
 
 
 

Counterterrorism in the United States
Executive branch of the government of the United States
George W. Bush administration controversies
Political philosophy
Presidency of the United States
Theories of law
Law of the United States
United States national security policy